Jack Jennings may refer to:
 Jack Jennings (American football)
 Jack Jennings (Australian footballer)
 Jack Jennings (basketball, born 1918)
 Jack Jennings (basketball, born 1969)
 Jack Jennings (politician)

See also
 John Jennings (disambiguation)